A list of sculptors from Poland:

A B C D E F G H I J K L M N O P  R S T U V W  Z Ł Ś Ż

A
Magdalena Abakanowicz
Harry Abend
Wiesław Adamski
Kazimierz Adamski
Paweł Althamer
Sylwester Ambroziak

B
 Fryderyk Bauman
 Mirosław Bałka
 Zdzisław Beksiński
 Jan Berdyszak
 Bolesław Biegas
 Tadeusz Breyer
 Alicja Buławka-Fankidejska

C
 Michał Ceptowski

D

 Karl Duldig (1902–1986), born in what is now Poland
 Xawery Dunikowski
 Krystyna Dąbrowska
 Czesław Dźwigaj

F
 Wojciech Fangor
 Antoni Frąckiewicz

G
 Henryk Glicenstein
 Izabella Godlewska
 Chaim Goldberg
 Józef Gosławski
 Wojciech Gryniewicz
 Zbylut Grzywacz

H
 Władysław Hasior
 Zbigniew Horbowy

J
 Zuzanna Janin
 Maria Jarema
 Jerzy Jarnuszkiewicz
 Kazimierz Jelski
 Giennadij Jerszow

K
 Tadeusz Kantor
 Jerzy Kenar
 Katarzyna Kobro
 Marian Konieczny
 Mateusz Kossior
 Adam Kossowski
 Katarzyna Kozyra
 Józef Antoni Kraus
 Wojciech Kucharski
 Henryk Kuna
 Baltazar Kuncz

L
Konstanty Laszczka

M
 Paweł Maliński
 Leonard Marconi
 Marian Hess
 Agata Materowicz
 Igor Mitoraj

N
 Dorota Nieznalska

P
 Krzysztof Perwanger
 Wojciech Pietranik
 Franciszek Pinck
 Jan Jerzy Plersch

R
 Jan Chryzostom Redler
 Jan Regulski
 Wojciech Rojowski
 Marcin Rożek

S
 Anton Schimser
 Monika Sosnowska
 Stanisław Stwosz
 Wit Stwosz
 Alina Szapocznikow
 Jan Sawka
 Stanisław Szukalski

T
 Jakub Tatarkiewicz
 Karol Tchorek
 Wiktor Tołkin
 Piotr Triebler

U
 Witold Urbanowicz

W
 Jan de Weryha-Wysoczański
 Edward Wittig
 Antoni Wiwulski

Z
 August Zamoyski
 Barbara Zbrożyna

Ż
 Teresa Żarnowerówna

See also
Art
List of Polish artists
List of Polish graphic designers
List of Polish photographers
List of Polish contemporary artists
List of Polish painters

 
sculptors
Polish sculptors